The Site historique maritime de la Pointe-au-Père is a maritime museum located in Rimouski, Quebec, Canada, that displays 200 years of maritime history, and includes the first submarine open since 2009 to the public in Canada, .

Collection
In 2008, the retired Canadian Forces   was towed from Halifax, Nova Scotia to the museum, where it has . The exhibition of the museum ship also explains the lifestyle of submarine crew members, and includes an audio-guided tour.

The Empress of Ireland museum displays artifacts from the wreckage of the ocean liner , which was sunk offshore in 1914.

The , includes guided tours of the Pointe-au-Père Lighthouse, the keeper's house, foghorn shed, engineer's shed and other light station buildings.

Affiliations
The museum is affiliated with: CMA,  CHIN, and Virtual Museum of Canada.

See also

 List of museum ships 
 Ship replica 
 Ships preserved in museums

References

External links

 Official website
 Official website 

 
Maritime museums in Quebec
Museums in Bas-Saint-Laurent
Buildings and structures in Rimouski
Museums established in 1980
1980 establishments in Quebec